Jan Scheere (born 25 June 1909, date of death unknown) was a Belgian modern pentathlete. He competed at the 1936 Summer Olympics.

References

External links
 

1909 births
Year of death missing
Belgian male modern pentathletes
Olympic modern pentathletes of Belgium
Modern pentathletes at the 1936 Summer Olympics